This is a list of winners and nominees of the Primetime Emmy Award for Outstanding Makeup for a Variety, Nonfiction or Reality Program. From 2000 until 2019, the award was presented as Outstanding Makeup for a Multi-Camera Series or Special (Non-Prosthetic) before being renamed.

In the following list, the first titles listed in gold are the winners; those not in gold are nominees, which are listed in alphabetical order. The years given are those in which the ceremonies took place:



Winners and nominations

2000s
Outstanding Makeup for a Multi-Camera Series or Special (Non-Prosthetic)

2010s

2020s
Outstanding Contemporary Makeup for a Variety, Nonfiction or Reality Program (Non-Prosthetic)

Programs with multiple wins

9 wins
 Saturday Night Live

2 wins
 Dancing with the Stars

Programs with multiple nominations
Total include nominations for Outstanding Makeup for a Series.

15 nominations
 Saturday Night Live

14 nominations
 Dancing with the Stars

10 nominations
 MADtv

6 nominations
 RuPaul's Drag Race
 So You Think You Can Dance

5 nominations
 The Voice

4 nominations
 Key & Peele

3 nominations
 How I Met Your Mother

2 nominations
 Legendary

References

Outstanding Makeup for a Variety, Nonfiction or Reality Program (Non-Prosthetic)
Makeup awards
Awards established in 2008